South Carolina Highway 28 Alternate may refer to:

South Carolina Highway 28 Alternate (Antreville), a former alternate route in Antreville
South Carolina Highway 28 Alternate (Ellenton), a former alternate route in Ellenton
South Carolina Highway 28 Alternate (Hampton), a former alternate route in Hampton

028 Alternate
028 Alternate